Madhav Rao Bhat II (18 April 1774 – 27 October 1795) was the 12th Peshwa of the Maratha Empire in India, from his infancy. He was known as Sawai Madhav Rao or Madhav Rao Narayan. He was the posthumous son of Narayanrao Peshwa, murdered in 1773 on the orders of Raghunathrao. Madhavrao II was considered the legal heir, and was installed  as Peshwa by the Treaty of Salbai in 1782 after First Anglo-Maratha War.

Early life

Madhavrao II was the posthumous son of Peshwa Narayanrao by his wife, Gangabai. After Narayanrao's murder by Raghunathrao's supporters, he became the Peshwa. But he was soon deposed by Nana Phadnavis and 11 other administrators in what is called "The Baarbhaai Conspiracy" (Conspiracy by the Twelve). Raghunathrao was tried, convicted, and sentenced to death by the justice Ram Shastri Prabhune but the sentence was never carried out. They instead installed  Gangabai's newborn son, Madhavrao II, as the Peshwa. The twelve then formed a council of the state known as the Bara Bhai for the conduct of the affairs of the state in the name of the new Peshwa, Sawai Madhav Rao, as he was made Peshwa when he was barely 40 days old. His time in power was dominated by the political intrigues of Nana Fadnavis.

Reign

First Anglo-Maratha War
After the British loss in 1782 in the First Anglo-Maratha War, Mahadji Shinde got Madhvrao recognized as Peshwa by the British. However, all powers of the Peshwa were in the hands of ministers like Nana Fadnavis, Mahadaji Shinde and others.

Involvement in Anglo-Mysore Wars

Mysore had been attacking the Maratha Confederacy since 1761.

To counter the menace presented by Mysore's Hyder Ali and Tipu Sultan the Peshwa supported the English.

During the Third Anglo-Mysore War the British East India Company was alarmed by the strength and the gains made by the Maratha Confederacy not just against Mysore but also in India.

Chaos in Delhi, Mughal Darbar
In 1788, Ghulam Qadir attacked Delhi, Mahadaji Shinde led the army of Marathas to Delhi and saved the Mughal Emperor and his family.

Subjugation of Rajput
In 1790, the Mahadji Shinde won over Rajput States in the Battle of Patan. After the death of Mahadaji Shinde In 1794, the Maratha power got concentrated in the hands of Nana Fadnavis.

Zoo
Madhavrao was fond of the outdoors and had a private collection of exotic animals such as lions and rhinos. 

The area where he hunted became later the Peshwe Park zoo in Pune. He was particularly fond of his herd of trained dancing deer.

Death
Madhavrao committed suicide at the age of 21 by jumping off from the high walls of the Shaniwar Wada in Pune. The cause of the suicide probably was that he could not endure the highhandedness of Nana Fadnavis. Just before his suicide, it is said that in ordering the execution of the despised police commissioner, Ghashiram Kotwal, Madhavrao was able to defy the wishes of Nana for the first time.

Succession
Peshwa Sawai Madhavrao II died in 1795 with no heir. Therefore, he was succeeded by Raghunathrao's son, Baji Rao II.

See also
Nana Fadnavis
Mahadaji Pant Guruji
Mahadaji Shinde 
Narayan Rao

References

External links

See also
 Maratha Empire
 Peshawe Family
 Peshwa
 Maratha emperors

1774 births
1795 deaths
Peshwa dynasty
People of the Maratha Empire
Marathi people
18th-century Indian monarchs
Indian Hindus
Child monarchs
Child monarchs from Asia